The Subhas Brigade, or the 1st Guerrilla Regiment was a unit of the Indian National Army (INA). The unit was formed in 1943 and unofficially referred to as Subhas Brigade after the Indian independence leader Subhas Chandra Bose, who at the time was also the supreme commander of the army. The unit was the first and major commitment of the second INA in the Imphal Offensive, and along with Azad, Gandhi and Nehru Brigade, the Army's contribution to the Imperial Japanese Army's U-go offensive.

The Brigade was divided into three battalions under the command of Shah Nawaz Khan. By the beginning of January 1944, it had reached Rangoon in Burma, where two battalions remained to guard the border between Burma and India near Haka while the third advanced into India across the Kaladan River. Elements of the Brigade subsequently took part in the Battles of Imphal and Kohima, where they were forced to withdraw alongside the Japanese forces they supported. These battles marked the turning point in the Burma Campaign.

Bose himself did not wish to have the Brigade named for him, but the name was kept.

Notes

Sources 
 
 Getz, Marshall J., Subhas Chandra Bose: A Biography, 2002, quoted in a Stone & Stone review by Bill Stone.

South-East Asian theatre of World War II
Military units and formations of the Indian National Army